Berit Unn Sandvik Johansen (born 18 July 1947) is a Norwegian figure skater. She became Norwegian champion in 1964. She competed at the Winter Olympics in 1964.

Results

References

External links

Navigation

1947 births
Living people
Sportspeople from Oslo
Norwegian female single skaters
Olympic figure skaters of Norway
Figure skaters at the 1964 Winter Olympics
20th-century Norwegian women